Frank Gaines Harris (April 25, 1871 – December 30, 1944) was an American Democratic politician from the state of Missouri. He was the state's 33rd Lieutenant Governor and held that office longer than anyone else until Peter Kinder surpassed that record, serving three terms from 2005 until 2017.

Personal history
Frank G. Harris was born in Boone County, Missouri to parents Robert and Mary E. (Proctor) Harris. He received his higher education at the Kirksville Normal School (now Truman State University) and graduated from the University of Missouri with an L.L.B. in Law in 1898. Harris established a law practice in Columbia, Missouri after passing the Bar. He and his wife, Grace (Sims) Harris, were the parents of two daughters and a son.

Political history
Frank G. Harris served as Boone County Prosecuting Attorney for six years before being elected to the Missouri General Assembly. He first served in the House of Representatives then as State Senator from the 10th district between 1915 and 1932. In 1932 he won the first of three consecutive terms as Lieutenant Governor and did not choose to run for a fourth. Harris died of heart failure shortly before the end of his third term.

References

Lieutenant Governors of Missouri
University of Missouri alumni
Truman State University alumni
People from Boone County, Missouri
Lawyers from Columbia, Missouri
Democratic Party Missouri state senators
1871 births
1944 deaths
Burials at Columbia Cemetery (Columbia, Missouri)